Gisela Röhl is a German former professional racing cyclist. She won the German National Road Race Championship in 1973 and 1974.

References

External links

Year of birth missing (living people)
Living people
German female cyclists
Place of birth missing (living people)
20th-century German women